Elizabeth M. Harper''' (Liz) is an evolutionary biologist known for her work on molluscs. She is an honorary fellow of the British Antarctic Survey and was accorded the title of Honorary Professor by the University of Cambridge in 2019.

Education and career 
Harper was born in Ipswich, Suffolk. She has a B.A. (and M.A Cantab) from the University of Cambridge and earned her doctorate from the Open University. As of 2021, Harper is a professor at the University of Cambridge, and a fellow of Gonville and Caius college. Harper has used the collections at the Sedgwick Museum of Earth Sciences for her research, and she was made an honorary curator of the invertebrate paleontology in 2004, and has twice served as acting director of the museum. In 2019, the University of Cambridge bestowed the title of Honorary Professor of Evolutionary Malacology on Harper.

Research
Harper's research focuses on molluscan biology and biomineralization. Her early research used genome size in living organisms to infer genome size in fossils. She has subsequently examined the process of biomineralization, or how bivalves make cement, how pteropods repair their shells, and the factors controlling the shape of shells in blue mussels and oysters. She has defined the factors controlling feeding on molluscs by examining drilling into shells, and worked on a collaborative project that considered multiple areas of research to define the origins of bivalves. Harper's research includes investigations into how different species of molluscs may respond to future changes in water chemistry, most recently revealing how brachiopods are able to alter the thickness of their shell under conditions that would lead to increased dissolution of their shells. She has lectured at The Perse School on the origins of molluscs, and how shells can explain adaptions of organisms to the environment.

Selected publications

Awards and honors 
In 1990, Harper received the President's Award from the Palaeontological Association. As of 2021, Harper is named an honorary fellow of the British Antarctic Survey.

References

External links 
, 10 June 2021 lecture by Harper

Year of birth missing (living people)
Living people
British evolutionary biologists
Women evolutionary biologists
Women zoologists
British women biologists
21st-century British zoologists
20th-century British zoologists
Fellows of Gonville and Caius College, Cambridge
Alumni of the Open University
Alumni of the University of Cambridge
British malacologists
Scientists from Ipswich